Imagination & the Misfit Kid is the second studio album by English singer-songwriter Labrinth, released on 22 November 2019. The album was recorded in London and New York City and features vocals by singers Sia and Zendaya. While the album did not chart upon release, it entered the charts in 2022 when single "Mount Everest" was featured in Euphoria, and was included in both of Labrinth's scores for the show.

Background
In an October 2019 interview, Labrinth described Imagination & the Misfit Kid as a "concept collection about a child who sells his imagination to a businessman in exchange for success", while the album announcement called it an "adventure is laced together by the story of a journey through art, commerce, and imagination." The album was released for digital download and streaming on 22 November 2019, with the LP released on 28 February 2020.

"Misbehaving" was released as the first single from the record on 15 September 2017. "Miracle", "Mount Everest", "All for Us", "Something's Got To Give", "Where the Wild Things" and "Like a Movie" were released as singles prior to the album release in 2019. "Oblivion" served as the album's eighth single. Imagination & the Misfit Kid was written and produced entirely by Labrinth, with additional writing by Darren Poole, Ilya Salmanzadeh, Ammar Malik, Jason Evigan and Cass Lowe on select tracks. Labrinth wrote "Oblivion" with featured artist Sia, and the song was later re-recorded and featured on her 2021 album Music – Songs from and Inspired by the Motion Picture.

The album's music is influenced by hip-hop, electro, gospel, video game music, and the sounds of the '70s and '80s.

Critical reception
In her review for Clash, Narzra Ahmed stated that Labrinth has "plenty of fun with his sound" and scored the album seven out of ten. Alex Green of the Belfast Telegraph, who positively reviewed the album, stated that it was "simultaneously more experimental and more jam-packed with potential pop hits than his debut", while Damien Morris of The Observer gave the album one out of five stars, opining that Labrinth's "inventive music is decent in tiny bursts, but wearying at album length". The track "Where the Wild Things" was included on Time magazine's five best songs of the week of 1 November 2019. The list's curator, Raisa Bruner praised the song as "consistently compelling".

Appearances in other media
The song "All for Us" was performed by American singer Zendaya in the first season finale of the drama series Euphoria. It garnered the Primetime Emmy Award for Outstanding Original Music And Lyrics in 2020.

The song "Like a Movie" appears in Apple's iPhone 13 Pro 'Hollywood in your pocket' TV ad campaign.

Track listing

Charts

Release history

References

2019 albums
Labrinth albums
Syco Music albums
Albums produced by Labrinth
Albums produced by Ilya Salmanzadeh
RCA Records albums